The Feel Good Drinks Company is a soft drinks company based in the United Kingdom. It is run as an incubator brand and owned by Nichols plc. It sells in supermarkets, restaurants, cafes and bars across the United Kingdom. 

Feel Good Drinks produces range of 100% natural fruitful sparkling water drinks in plastic free packaging. All products contain no sweeteners, preservatives or added sugar. They give back 3% of their sales to charities that support personal and planetary wellbeing.

Companies based in Merseyside
Drink companies of the United Kingdom
Newton-le-Willows
Soft drinks manufacturers